Bharatiya Janata Party is the affiliate of Bharatiya Janata Party for the state of Madhya Pradesh. The party appointed V. D. Sharma as the president of the BJP Madhya Pradesh on 15 February 2020 who took over from Rakesh Singh. On 23 March 2020, Shivraj Singh Chouhan took oath as the Chief Minister Of Madhya Pradesh after the Kamal Nath led Govt collapsed due to defection of Jyotiraditya Scindia.

Electoral History

Legislative Assembly election

Lok Sabha election

Leadership

Chief Minister

Leader of the Opposition

President

See also 
 Bharatiya Janata Party, Gujarat
 Bharatiya Janata Party, Uttar Pradesh
 Bharatiya Janata Party, Madhya Pradesh
 Organisation of the Bharatiya Janata Party

Notes

References 

Political parties in Madhya Pradesh
Madhya Pradesh